The 2021 Rose Bowl (branded as the College Football Playoff Semifinal at the Rose Bowl Game presented by Capital One for sponsorship reasons) was a college football bowl game played on January 1, 2021, with kickoff at 3:00 p.m. CST at AT&T Stadium in Arlington, Texas. The 107th playing of the Rose Bowl Game, it was one of two College Football Playoff (CFP) semifinal games; it pitted two of the four teams selected by the College Football Playoff Selection Committee—Notre Dame from the Atlantic Coast Conference (ACC), and Alabama from the Southeastern Conference (SEC), with its winner facing the winner of the Sugar Bowl, Ohio State, at the 2021 College Football Playoff National Championship. It was also one of the 2020–21 bowl games concluding the 2020 FBS football season.

It was the first playing of the Rose Bowl outside of Pasadena, California, since the 1942 game played at Duke University, in a move prompted by the COVID-19 pandemic in California.

Impact of the COVID-19 pandemic 
The game was originally scheduled to be played at the Rose Bowl stadium in Pasadena, California. In early December 2020, it was announced that the bowl would be contested behind closed doors without fans, due to California Governor Gavin Newsom's orders in response to the COVID-19 pandemic in California. Organizers attempted to negotiate an exemption to the health orders—which prohibit any spectators at a sporting event—in order to allow the family members of participating players to attend. However, they were denied.

On December 15, the Los Angeles Times reported that "serious considerations" were being made to re-locate the game due to the state of the pandemic in California, with major surges in new cases, and ICU capacity in Southern California declared to be 0% as of December 17. On December 19, 2020, the Pasadena Tournament of Roses Association announced that the game would be relocated to AT&T Stadium in Arlington, Texas. The only prior time the Rose Bowl was played outside of Pasadena was in 1942 during World War II; after large gatherings were prohibited on the west coast due to fears of a Japanese attack following the attack on Pearl Harbor in December 1941, the game was re-located to Duke Stadium in Durham, North Carolina.

The Association stated that it was not immediately clear if the game would still be called the "Rose Bowl", as consent would also have to be obtained from the city of Pasadena, due to a master license agreement covering use of the name (which is co-owned by the Tournament of Roses Association and Pasadena's municipal government). A later press release from the Association referred to the game as the College Football Playoff Semifinal presented by Capital One, pending a decision on usage of the Rose Bowl name.

A formal decision was scheduled to be discussed by city officials in Pasadena on December 22. On December 30, the City of Pasadena approved use of the Rose Bowl name for the game in Arlington, reportedly after receiving $2 million from the Tournament of Roses “to assist the city with its expenses and lost revenue”.

The game was allowed to have 16,000 fans in attendance. The University of Alabama fan ticket allotment was 3,380. In comparison, the 2021 Sugar Bowl in New Orleans only would be allowed 3,000 fans in the Superdome in total.

College Football Playoff

Teams
Teams for the game were selected by the College Football Playoff selection committee and announced on December 20, 2020. The game matched top-ranked Alabama and fourth-ranked Notre Dame. In seven prior meetings, Notre Dame held a 5–2 edge; the programs had most recently played in the 2013 BCS National Championship Game, which Alabama won by a score of 42–14.

Alabama Crimson Tide

Alabama entered the bowl with an 11–0 record, having won all 10 of their Southeastern Conference (SEC) regular season games, followed by a win over Florida in the SEC Championship Game. The Crimson Tide had last appeared in a CFP semifinal game following the 2018 season, when they defeated Oklahoma in the Orange Bowl. Alabama had previously appeared in six Rose Bowl games, most recently in 1946, with a record of 4–1–1.

Notre Dame Fighting Irish

Notre Dame entered the bowl with a 10–1 record. The Fighting Irish, who traditionally compete in football as an independent, played the 2020 season as a member of the Atlantic Coast Conference (ACC). Notre Dame defeated nine ACC teams and one non-conference program (South Florida) during the regular season, then lost to Clemson in the ACC Championship Game. The Fighting Irish had last appeared in a CFP semifinal game following the 2018 season, when they lost to Clemson in the Cotton Bowl. The only prior appearance by Notre Dame in the Rose Bowl had been a victory over Stanford in the 1925 edition.

Game summary

Statistics

See also
 2020 Cotton Bowl Classic, played at the same venue two days prior

References

Further reading

External links

Game statistics at statbroadcast.com

Rose Bowl
Rose Bowl
Rose Bowl Game
Alabama Crimson Tide football bowl games
Notre Dame Fighting Irish football bowl games
Rose Bowl
Rose Bowl
Rose Bowl